Abdel Latif Moubarak (Arabic: عبد اللطيف مبارك) is an Egyptian poet (born 1964). He is a member of the Egyptian Writers Union and a member of the Arab Writers on the Internet. He was born in Suez and writes poetry using classical Arabic and Egyptian vernacular. He received a Bachelor of Law from Ain Shams University. He was one of the most important poets of the 1980s and his poems were published in several literary magazines in Egypt and the Arab world, including the Arab magazine, Kuwait magazine, News Literature, Republic newspaper, Al-Ahram, the new publishing culture (magazine).
Received the Excellence and Creativity Shield from the Arab Media Union in 2014
and Won the shield of excellence and creativity from the East Academy 2021

Published works
1994: أحاسيس وأصداء | Feelings and echoes, Egypt.
1996: العزف على هدير المدافع | Playing the roar of cannons, Egypt.
1997: همسات البحر| Sea whispers, Egypt.
2001: قراءة ثانية للجسد| A second reading of the body, Egypt.
2007: | نوبة عطش A bout of thirst
2016: بتجرب تانى تموت| Experienced death again
2018: قبس من جمر| Some of embers

See also

Ahmed Fouad Negm
Salah Jaheen
Abdel Rahman el-Abnudi

References

World Encyclopedia of Arab poetry 
Arabic poetry Abgad Encyclopedia
Arabic poetry qassida Encyclopedia
Arabic poetry sh6r Encyclopedia

External links
 A compilation of  press articles and interviews with Abdel latif Moubarak, in Arabic.
 Samples of his poet Abdel Latif Moubarak in the voice of Arabism, in Arabic.
 Poet in Diwan Alarab, in Arabic.
  poet in Poetry Soup.
 Poet in Seventh day newspaper, in Arabic.
  The International Encyclopedia of Arabic Poetry. 
  Poets portal.
  Arab Worled Books .
 poetsgate .
 Arabic poetry... ِAbdel latif Moubarak .
 albawabhnews .
 darelhilal .
 famousfix .
 alahram-platform .
 cairo24 .
 almasryalyoum .
 Al-Ahram daily .
 elqmaa .
zad  .

Of his poems

 Wonderfulness without an identity
 The secret remains in your eyes a pearl
 You said... Not everything 
 So you give heart a propel
 If the nights narrow for us to live...
 Sometimes by love we surrounded 
 A feature of something ... we perceive it ... we touch it
 Lived in the vibrations of lightning
Wonderfulness without an identity
 It was silence nectar  
 And atheism stealth in the pulse of the fire
 Light of wish
 A survival tune playing
 The culmination of the bombing of contaminated grief
 With blood... And with tears
 Still your eyes are joyful
 Like Fertile Survival planting... 
 To painful feeling disappointments
 In addition, 
 I feel that you are in my dolls
 Cracks freshness passion 
 At ground of this seedling
 From ache of the crowds
 Existence...
 Entity filtered sense  
 From the memory distraction

20th-century Egyptian poets
1964 births
Living people
Egyptian male poets
People from Suez
20th-century male writers
Free Egyptians Party politicians
Egyptian children's writers
Muslim poets
Proponents of Islamic feminism
20th-century publishers (people)
21st-century male writers
Egyptian screenwriters
Romantic poets